Sheikh Mohammed bin Hamad bin Mohammed Al Sharqi (born 1 April 1986) is the Crown Prince of the Emirate of Fujairah, in the United Arab Emirates. He is the eldest son of Sheikh Hamad bin Mohammed Al Sharqi, Member of the Supreme Council, Sheikh of Fujairah and Chairman of the Fujairah Foundation for Regions Development. He is a graduate of Webster University, London.

Sheikh Mohammed bin Hamad, Crown Prince of Fujairah, married the daughter of Sheikh Mohammed bin Rashid Al Maktoum, Vice President of the UAE, Ruler of Dubai and Prime Minister of the UAE.

Family
In February 2009, he married his second cousin Sheikha Latifa bint Mohammed bin Rashid Al Maktoum, daughter of the current ruler of Dubai and sister to both the crown prince of Dubai Hamdan bin Mohammed Al Maktoum and its deputy ruler Maktoum bin Mohammed Al Maktoum. They have five children:

 Sheikh Hamad bin Mohammed bin Hamad bin Mohammed Al Sharqi (born 29 December 2009).
 Sheikha Aisha bint Mohammed bin Hamad bin Mohammed Al Sharqi (born 1 November 2011).
 Sheikha Fatima bint Mohammed bin Hamad bin Mohammed Al Sharqi (born 11 March 2014).
 Sheikh Rashid bin Mohammed bin Hamad bin Mohammed Al Sharqi (born 15 December 2015).
 Sheikha Hind bint Mohammed bin Hamad Al Sharqi (born 22 June 2020).

Ancestry

The Crown Prince is descended from the 3 of the 6 royal families that rule the UAE

References

1986 births
Living people
Sheikhs of the Emirate of Fujairah
Crown princes
Webster University alumni
Sons of monarchs